Qeshlaq-e Aji Eshmeh may refer to:
Qeshlaq-e Aji Eshmeh-ye Ali Heydar Beyg
Qeshlaq-e Aji Eshmeh-ye Nurahmad
Qeshlaq-e Aji Eshmeh-ye Papur